Gastrodia cooperae, also known as Cooper's black potato orchid, is a species of plant in the family Orchidaceae and is endemic to New Zealand. The specific epithet cooperae refers to Dorothy A. Cooper, founder of the New Zealand Native Orchid Group.

Gastrodia cooperae is a parasitic orchid; it produces no chlorophyll.

The plant is listed in New Zealand as 'Threatened - Nationally Critical'. There are only three known sites where it grows, and it is believed that fewer than 250 mature specimens are living today.

References

External links
Gastropodia cooperae at the New Zealand Plant Conservation Network

cooperae
Endangered plants
Endemic orchids of New Zealand
Plants described in 2016